Scott Ryan Gordon (born May 1, 1981) is an American professional golfer who plays on the PGA Tour. 

Gordon graduated from the University of California, Davis in 2004 and turned professional that year. In 2008, he qualified for the Nationwide Tour, playing in 26 tournaments and making four cuts. Gordon made it to the final stage of qualifying school for the PGA Tour in 2010, and earned his playing rights for the following year by a single stroke. This made him the first ever UC Davis Aggie golfer to make it to the PGA Tour.

See also
2010 PGA Tour Qualifying School graduates

References

External links

American male golfers
PGA Tour golfers
Golfers from Sacramento, California
University of California, Davis alumni
People from Fair Oaks, California
1981 births
Living people